Charadrahyla tecuani is a frog in the family Hylidae.  It is endemic to Mexico.  Scientists have seen it solely in the type locality in the Sierra Madre del Sur mountains.

References

Frogs of North America
Amphibians described in 2009
tecuani